The first season of America's Got Talent: The Champions featured around 50 participants from across the Got Talent franchise, ranging from winners, live round participants – quarter-finalists (where applicable), semi-finalists and finalists – and other notable acts. The judging panel consisted of Simon Cowell, Heidi Klum, Mel B, and Howie Mandel, all of whom judged the previous season of the main series. Terry Crews served as host.

Overview 
The contest's preliminaries rounds that featured around 10 participants who competed to secure a place within the finals. Twelve were chosen, five from Golden Buzzers, five from public votes, and two chosen as Wildcards. The following table lists each participant that took part, their history in the Got Talent franchise – the respective international version and season they appeared in, and the result of their corresponding performance in each – and their overall result in the contest:

 |  |  | 
 |  Golden Buzzer Finalist |  Wildcard Finalist

Preliminaries Summary 
 |  | 
 |  |  Buzzed out

Preliminary 1 (January 7)

Preliminary 2 (January 14) 

  Darci Lynne was later made a wildcard act for the Grand-final by the judges.

Preliminary 3 (January 21) 

  Jon Dorenbos was later made a wildcard act for the Grand-final by the judges.

Preliminary 4 (January 28)

Preliminary 5 (February 4) 

  David Hasselhoff, a former judge of America's Got Talent and Britain's Got Talent, made a special appearance as part of Colin Cloud's performance.

Finals Summary

Top 12 Final (February 11)

Grand-final (February 18) 
 |  | 

Guest performers: Tokio Myers & Voices of Hope Children's Choir, The Clairvoyants, Cirque du Soleil, and Jackie Evancho

References

America's Got Talent
Competitions